Beheaded may refer to:

 The intentional separation of the head from the body as a form of decapitation

 Beheading of John the Baptist, a holy day observed by various Christian churches which follow liturgical traditions

Music

Artists 
 Beheaded (band), a death metal band from Malta

Albums 
 Beheaded (album), a 1996 album by Bedhead

Songs 
 "Beheaded", by The Offspring from The Offspring (album)

See also